Alyaksandr Ivanavich Mazhavoy (Russian transliteration: Aleksandr Ivanovich Mozgovoy; ; ; born 20 October 1966) is a former Belarusian football player. He works as a children's coach in the academy of Standard Liège.

References

External links
 

1966 births
Living people
Soviet footballers
Belarusian footballers
Belarusian expatriate footballers
Expatriate footballers in Russia
Expatriate footballers in Ukraine
Expatriate footballers in Poland
Expatriate footballers in Belgium
Russian Premier League players
Ukrainian Premier League players
FC Lida players
FC Torpedo Minsk players
FC Dnepr Mogilev players
FC Vitebsk players
FC Spartak Vladikavkaz players
FC Lokomotiv Vitebsk (defunct) players
FC Zorya Luhansk players
Zawisza Bydgoszcz players
Place of birth missing (living people)
R.C.S. Verviétois players
Association football defenders